Matthew Raper (1705–1778) was a British astronomer, mathematician, and scholar in various fields. He published papers on diverse subjects, including ancient Greek coinage and Roman currency, as well as their measures and their history from Greek and Latin texts.

Raper was elected to the Royal Society on 30 May 1754 and was awarded the Copley Medal in 1771 for a paper "Inquiry into the Value of the ancient Greek and Roman Money." He translated Dissertation on the Gipseys from Heinrich Grellman's German original and wrote diverse papers such as "An Enquiry into the Measure of the Roman Foot" (1760) and "Observations on the Moon's Eclipse, March 17., and the Sun's Eclipse, April 1, 1764."

Matthew Raper's father was also named Matthew and left him the Manor of Thorley, Hertfordshire, upon his death in 1748. Raper had an observatory on the roof of the manor house; upon his death in 1778, the manorial rights passed to his brother John Raper.

References

External links
https://web.archive.org/web/20110928211921/http://www.stortfordhistory.co.uk/thorley/thorley_1.html

1705 births
1778 deaths
18th-century British mathematicians
18th-century British astronomers
British numismatists
Fellows of the Royal Society
Recipients of the Copley Medal